The Chief Minister of Gujarat is the chief executive of the government of the Indian state of Gujarat. The governor appoints the chief minister, whose council of ministers are collectively responsible to the assembly. The chief minister's term is for five years and is subject to no term limits, given that he has the confidence of the assembly.

The state of Gujarat was created on 1 May 1960, composed of the Gujarati-speaking districts of Bombay State following the Mahagujarat Movement. Jivraj Narayan Mehta of the INC was the inaugural chief minister. Narendra Modi of the BJP is the longest serving chief minister for twelve and a half years from 2001 to 2014. He resigned in 2014 to become the 14th prime minister of India. He was succeeded by Anandiben Patel who became the state's first woman chief minister. The current chief minister is Bhupendrabhai Patel of the BJP. He was elected for the post following the resignation of then incumbent Vijay Rupani, who was in the office since 7 August 2016.

Chief Ministers of Gujarat

Statistics
List of chief ministers by length of term

List by party

Timeline

Notes
Footnotes

References

External links
Chief Minister of Gujarat

Gujarat
 
Chief Ministers